The Italy national cycling team represents Italy in International cycling competitions such as Olympic Games or World cycling Championships.

History
The national Italian cyclingteam participated to all the Summer Olympics editions, from Paris 1900, 24 times on 26.

Medal tables

Olympic Games
In pink color the women's medals.

Multiple medalists

Olympic Games

See also
Italy at the Olympics
Cycling Summer Olympics medal table

References

External links
Italy cycling at Summer Olympics
 Official site of the Federazione Ciclistica Italiana

Cycling
Cycling teams based in Italy
National cycling teams